Special education is the practice of educating students in a way that addresses their individual differences and needs.

Special Education may also refer to:
 Special Education (Glee), an episode of the American musical television series Glee
 Special Education (film), a 1977 Yugoslav drama
 "Special Education" (song), a 2013 song by Goodie Mob featuring Janelle Monáe